Adeje was one of the 9 menceyatos guanches (native kingdoms) that had divided the island of Tenerife (Canary Islands, Spain) before the arrival of the conquering Spaniards and occupied the present day towns of Guía de Isora, Adeje, Santiago del Teide, as well as possibly also part of Arona, in the southwest of Tenerife. 

The kings of Adeje were Betzenuriya, Pelicar, Tinerfe and Sunta.

References

External links 
 Menceyatos de Tenerife

Adeje
Former kingdoms